Harry Reginald Jenkins  (24 October 1881 – 21 June 1970) was a New Zealand Member of Parliament for Parnell in Auckland, New Zealand, representing the United Party.

Member of Parliament

Jenkins represented the Parnell electorate from the 1928 general election to his resignation in 1930.

In 1925 he stood unsuccessfully for the Auckland City Council as an independent candidate and was also unsuccessful in 1927 standing on a Progressive Citizens' ticket.

Resignation
In March 1930, Jenkins left the United Party and announced that he believed that the Reform Party leader, Gordon Coates, was "the ablest man in Parliament".  He subsequently resigned his seat and then sought the Reform nomination in the by-election. Instead, Reform selected Bill Endean as its candidate. Endean won the by-election on 7 May 1930.

After leaving parliament he was elected as a member of the Auckland City Council in 1931 standing on the Citizens' ticket.

Notes

References

1881 births
1970 deaths
United Party (New Zealand) MPs
Members of the New Zealand House of Representatives
New Zealand MPs for Auckland electorates
Auckland City Councillors